The Block Realty-Baker House is a historic house located at 1900 Beechwood in Little Rock, Arkansas.

Description and history 
It is a -story masonry structure, five bays wide, with a side gable roof. Wood-framed ells extend to the rear, which are finished in weatherboard. The front roof is pierced by four gabled dormers, and the entrance, set in at the center of the front facade, is recessed in an opening with flanking sidelight and transom windows. The opening is topped by an entablature with cornice. It was designed in Colonial Revival style by architect John Parks Almand and built about 1940 by the Block Realty Company.

The house was listed on the National Register of Historic Places on September 24, 2008.

See also
National Register of Historic Places listings in Little Rock, Arkansas

References

Houses on the National Register of Historic Places in Arkansas
Colonial Revival architecture in Arkansas
Houses completed in 1940
Houses in Little Rock, Arkansas
National Register of Historic Places in Little Rock, Arkansas